The Yangman were an indigenous Australian people of the Northern Territory.

Language
The Yangman language was closely related to Wardaman and Dalabon, and survives fragmentarily as passive knowledge among a few Mangarrayi people, descendants through intermarriage of Yangman who once worked at Elsey Station and around Mataranka. Jimmy Daniels (d.1986) was the last known fluent native speaker, though rather reluctant to think back in his mother-tongue, and left a record of some 500 words in interviews with the linguist Francesca Merlan.

Country
In Tindale's estimation the Yangman's territory extended over some  covering basically the plateau terrain lying between the Roper and Victoria river systems. Its southern reaches extended to Elsey Creek, south of Mataranka, especially around Warlock Ponds, as far as Daly Waters. The Wardaman people lay to their west.

Notes

Citations

Sources

 

Aboriginal peoples of the Northern Territory